KOZR may refer to:

 KOZR-LP, a low-power radio station (102.9 FM) licensed to serve Gentry, Arkansas, United States
 the ICAO code for Cairns Army Airfield